The Iron Bridge is a grade I listed early cast iron bridge crossing a tributary of the River Lark in grounds of Culford Park in the village of Culford near Bury St Edmunds, Suffolk.

The bridge is of exceptional interest as one of the earliest bridges with an unmodified cast-iron structure to survive. Built for Charles Cornwallis, 2nd Marquess Cornwallis the owner of Culford Park in 1804, it is a unique example of a cast iron bridge built to the patent of Samuel Wyatt. The rib castings feature oval tubular sections and is the earliest known example with hollow ribs leading to the structure received a grade I listing on 15 May 1996.

The woods to the South West of the bridge is known as Iron Bridge Carr.

Design
On 10 June 1800 Samuel Wyatt patented a new design for ...constructing bridges, warehouse, and other builds without the use of wood... which was published in the Repertory of Arts and Manufactures: Vol.14 in 1801. 
The patent describes how to construct a bridge using: ...hollow pieces of cast iron in a longitudinal direction and plates or pipes of the same material, having sockets on them, to receive the ends or shoulders of the said pipes, tubes, or other hollow pieces, placed transversely; and extending from one side of the bridge to the other, so that when the required number of pipes, tubes, or other hollow pieces of cast-iron, and of transverse places, or pieces, are put together they form the arch, and so firmly fix, connect, and unite, all the parts, as not to require the aid of screws, bolts, cramps, or any wrought-iron fastenings whatever; but, for the sake of giving the joins a more equal bearing, it will be proper to run lead or cement into them.

The bridge at Culford follows this design with 5 cast iron voussoirs making up one segment arc which is repeated six times forming the 60 ft span connected with socketed joints. Arched plates between the ribs carry the infill up to roadway level with channelled granite abutments on either side. Masonry balustrades line the edge of the bridge 20 ft wide with carved marble urns at the ends.

Construction
The metal segments for the bridge were cast in 1804 by William Hawks and Son of Gateshead and weighed 80 tons, along with 2 tons of lead at a cost of £1,457. It's estimated that the additional cost of transportation, stonework, and construction gave a total of £10,000 for the installation of the bridge, approximately £1 million in 2019 prices. 

Samuel Wyatt 's brother James was appointed in the 1790s to make modifications to Culford Hall which drew heavily on Samuel's work at Shugborough Hall so it is likely Samuel's bridge design was introduced at this point.

The infill of the bridge between the deck and road surface was examined in 1998 as was found to be made up of; a single layer of yellow bricks, 15cm of chalk, 40cm of hoggin, finished with 5cm of topsoil with slight different composition at the abutments. It is believed that this material dates from the original construction.

Gallery

References

Bridges in Suffolk
Grade I listed bridges
Bridges completed in 1804
Grade I listed buildings in Suffolk
Culford
Cast-iron arch bridges in England